Eldbrooke United Methodist Church is a historic church building located at 4100 River Road NW in the Tenleytown neighborhood Washington, D.C.

History
The first church on this site, called Mount Zion Methodist, was established in 1840, in the vicinity of Tennally Town, a farming village, approximately three miles north of Georgetown, on the Rockville Pike.  The original structure may have been rebuilt after the Civil War. In 1899, the building was renovated and expanded, and the name was changed to Eldbrooke, after Aquila Eld and Philip Brooke, who were among the founders.

The Spanish Colonial Revival building, designed by Howard Wright Cutler, was built in 1926.  Descendants of the Eld family were still present in the 1960s.  After church membership had declined thru the latter 1900s, responsibility for ministry was assigned to Metropolitan Memorial United Methodist Church in the 1990s, and ministry was discontinued in early 2000s.  The property was purchased by The City Church in 2008.

It was added to the National Register of Historic Places and District of Columbia Inventory of Historic Sites in 2008.

References

External links
 

20th-century Methodist church buildings in the United States
Churches completed in 1926
Churches on the National Register of Historic Places in Washington, D.C.
District of Columbia Inventory of Historic Sites
Spanish Colonial Revival architecture in the United States
United Methodist churches in Washington, D.C.